Events in the year 1704 in Spain.

Incumbents
Monarch: Philip V

Events
August 1–3 - Capture of Gibraltar
August 24 - Battle of Málaga (1704)
September - beginning of Twelfth Siege of Gibraltar

Births

Deaths

References

 
1700s in Spain